Treasure Chest is a compilation album by the American folk music group the Kingston Trio, released in 1993 (see 1993 in music). It consists of B-sides to Kingston Trio singles, alternate takes, and songs recorded during album sessions by the Guard-Shane-Reynolds lineup, but rejected for release.

These tracks were previously released on the LP titled Hidden Treasures and the LP titled Rediscovered. A similar collection of songs featuring the Shane-Reynolds-Stewart lineup from the same two LPs was released on CD with the title Tune Up.

Track listing
 "Blue Tattoo" (Kenny Jacobson, Rhoda Roberts) – 2:43
 "Adieu to My Island" (Travis Edmonson) – 2:44
 "Sea Fever" (Jane Bowers, Irving Burgess) – 2:59
 "Sail Away Ladies" (Traditional) – 2:30
 "Scarlet Ribbons" (Evelyn Danzig, Jack Segal) – 2:20
 "Oh Mary" – 2:17
 "World's Last Authentic Playboys" (Bill Loughborough, David "Buck" Wheat) – 2:44
 "Ruby Red" (Lee Pockriss, Paul Vance) – 2:21
 "Home from the Hill" (Mack David, Bronisław Kaper) – 3:57
 "Sally" (Woody Guthrie) – 2:38
 "Oh Cindy" (Traditional) – 1:43
 "Wines of Madeira" (Traditional) – 3:02
 "Golden Spike" (Traditional) – 1:50
 "Green Grasses" (John Stewart) – 2:10

Personnel
Dave Guard – vocals, banjo, guitar
Bob Shane – vocals, guitar
Nick Reynolds – vocals, tenor guitar, conga
David "Buck" Wheat  – double bass

References

External links
Liner Notes and photos for Treasure Chest

The Kingston Trio albums
1993 compilation albums